"Sweet Disposition" is a song by Australian indie rock band The Temper Trap. Described by critics as an "indie anthem", the song was written by Dougy Mandagi and Lorenzo Silitto. Upon the song's release, it peaked at  14 in Australia and reached the top 10 in Flanders, Ireland, and the United Kingdom. Renewed interest in the song was generated after it was included in the soundtrack for the 2009 film 500 Days of Summer—eventually reaching No. 9 on the Billboard Alternative Songs chart in the United States.

Chart performance and sales
Despite the Temper Trap originating from Australia, "Sweet Disposition", the lead single from the debut album Conditions, proved to be more popular in the United Kingdom and Ireland, reaching No. 6 (in the week beginning 11 October 2009) and No. 8 respectively, while it only reached a peak of No. 14 in Australia. However, it was eventually certified 3× Platinum in Australia for sales exceeding 210,000 copies, becoming the band's highest-selling single in their home country.

The song reached No. 9 on Billboards Alternative Songs chart, due to interest in the song after it appeared in the film 500 Days of Summer. In 2014, it was featured in the action film 3 Days to Kill starring Kevin Costner. A dance remix made by Axwell and Dirty South of this song reached No. 1 on Billboards Hot Dance Airplay chart in April 2010. It received a Platinum certification from the RIAA in 2013 for more than 1,000,000 copies sold.

The single was certified Gold by the Federation of the Italian Music Industry and 2× Platinum in the United Kingdom by the British Phonographic Industry.

Music videos
There are three music videos for the song. The Australian/domestic version, directed by Madeline Griffith, features the band performing alongside slow motion footage of light bulbs smashing on the floor.

The UK/international version directed by Barnaby Roper, begins with a gradual descent towards the lights on a runway before featuring a girl roller blading through space, past transparent images of each band member. That version was also played in Australia following the song's increase in popularity in 2010. 

The US version, directed by Daniel Eskils, was released in March 2010. This version displays the band members playing around with musical instruments as well as demolishing them, this all being taped with a high-speed camera.

Track listings

Australian digital download
 "Sweet Disposition" – 3:54
 "Sweet Disposition" (video) – 3:54

Australian CD single
 "Sweet Disposition"
 "Sweet Disposition" (Curtis Vodka remix)

Australian 12-inch single
A1. "Sweet Disposition"
A2. "Sweet Disposition" (Curtis Vodka remix)
B1. "Science of Fear"
B2. "Science of Fear" (Pocketknife remix)

UK 7-inch picture disc single
A. "Sweet Disposition"
B. "Little Boy"

US remixes promo CDR
 "Sweet Disposition" (Dirty South remix)
 "Sweet Disposition" (Caged Baby disco remix)
 "Sweet Disposition" (Doorly's dubstep remix)

Charts

Weekly charts

Year-end charts

Certifications

Release history

In popular culture

Film
 The song was featured on the soundtrack for the 2009 romantic comedy 500 Days of Summer.
 The song was featured on the soundtrack and played during the ending scene for the 2014 action thriller film, 3 Days to Kill.
 The song was featured on the soundtrack for the 2020 romantic action film, I Still Believe.

Advertisements
 The song was used in the 2009 "Future Starts Here" advert for Center Parcs.
 The song was used in a 2009 Sky Sports advert featuring Jose Mourinho.
 The song was used in a 2009 O2 advert.
 The song was used in an 2010 Indonesian advert promoting the Toyota Yaris.
 The song was used in a long-form commercial for Chrysler released in 2010.
 The song was used in a commercial for Diet Coke that reportedly aired on the 2010 Academy Awards.
 The song was used in a 2010 commercial for Rhapsody Music service.

Gaming
 The song was featured on the soundtrack for the 2010 video game, Pro Evolution Soccer 2011.

See also
 List of number-one dance airplay hits of 2010 (U.S.)

References

2008 debut singles
2008 songs
2009 singles
APRA Award winners
ARIA Award-winning songs
Columbia Records singles
Infectious Records singles
Song recordings produced by Jim Abbiss
The Temper Trap songs
UK Independent Singles Chart number-one singles